Briarpatch is an American television series starring Rosario Dawson based on the 1984 Ross Thomas novel of the same name. The series was picked up in late January 2019 by USA Network, after being ordered to pilot in April 2018.

In advance of its broadcast premiere, several episodes of the series received a preview screening in the Primetime program of the 2019 Toronto International Film Festival.

The series premiered on February 6, 2020. On July 17, 2020, the series was canceled after one season.

Premise
When Detective Felicity Dill is killed in a car bombing, her sister Allegra Dill, an investigator working for a senator, returns home to San Bonifacio to find her killer. In the process of her investigation, she uncovers a web of corruption in the small Texas town.

Cast

Main
Rosario Dawson as Allegra "Pick" Dill
Jay R. Ferguson as Jake Spivey
Edi Gathegi as A.D. Singe
Brian Geraghty as Captain Gene Colder
Kim Dickens as Eve Raytek

Recurring
Charles Parnell as Cyrus
Allegra Edwards as Cindy McCabe
Kirk Fox as Sid
Enrique Murciano as Senator Joseph Ramirez
John Aylward as Freddie Laffter
Timm Sharp as Harold Snow
Christine Woods as Lucretia Colder
Susan Park as Daphne Owens
Alan Cumming as Clyde Brattle
Mel Rodriguez as Mayor Tony Salazar
David Paymer as Jimmy Jr.
Ed Asner as James Staghorne Sr.
Michele Weaver as Felicity Dill

Episodes

Reception
Briarpatch has received a Metacritic score of 66 based on 15 critics, indicating "generally favorable" reviews. Rotten Tomatoes gave an approval rating of 76% based on 25 critics, its consensus reads: "Briarpatch ambiance is at times more intriguing than the simmering mystery at its center, but a captivating Rosario Dawson and surreal setting ensure it's never less than watchable."

References

External links

2020 American television series debuts
2020 American television series endings
2020s American anthology television series
2020s American drama television series
English-language television shows
Television shows based on American novels
Television series by Anonymous Content
Television series by Paramount Television
Television series by Universal Content Productions
Television shows filmed in New Mexico
Television shows set in Texas
USA Network original programming